Lepyrus gemellus is a species of true weevil in the beetle family Curculionidae. It is found in North America.

References

Further reading

 
 

Molytinae
Articles created by Qbugbot
Beetles described in 1837